Camila Machín (born 3 September 1994) is an Argentinian born, Italian field hockey player.

Personal life
Camila Machín was born and raised in San Miguel de Tucumán.

Career

Argentina
In 2018, Machín made her international debut for the Argentine national team, Las Leonas. She was a member of the team at the XI South American Games in Cochabamba where she won a gold medal.

Italy
Following a four-year hiatus from international hockey, Machín returned to the world stage with the Italian national team in 2022.

She made her debut with Italy at the EuroHockey Championship Qualifiers in Vilnius. She went on to represent the team again at the inaugural edition of the FIH Nations Cup in Valencia.

References

External links

1994 births
Living people
Argentine female field hockey players
Italian female field hockey players
Female field hockey defenders
South American Games gold medalists for Argentina
South American Games medalists in field hockey
Competitors at the 2018 South American Games